A Mexican American ( or ) is a resident of the United States who is of Mexican descent.  Mexican American-related topics include the following:

0-9
 1st Arizona Volunteer Infantry
 1st New Mexico Volunteer Infantry, Reorganized
 1917 Bath riots
 1938 San Antonio pecan shellers strike
 1994 California Proposition 187
 2nd Regiment New Mexico Volunteer Infantry 
 2006 Harris County, Texas hate crime assault
 2019 El Paso shooting

A
 Abolish ICE
 Alianza Federal de Mercedes
 Always Running
 American GI Forum
 American-Mexican Claims Commission
 Anti-Mexican sentiment
 Arizona SB 1070
 Asco (art collective)
 August 29th Movement
 Aztlán

B
 Balmy Alley
 Barrioization
 Battle of Chavez Ravine
 Beaner
 Bernal v. Fainter
 Bisbee Deportation
 Black-brown unity
 Blaxican
 Bless Me, Ultima
 Bloody Christmas (1951)
 Borderlands/La Frontera: The New Mestiza
 Borderlands Theater
 Botiller v. Dominguez
 Bracero program
 Bracero Selection Process
 Brown Berets
 Brown-eyed soul
 Brown, Not White
 Burrito

C
 Caballero
 California agricultural strikes of 1933
 California Joint Immigration Committee
 Californio
 Caló (Chicano)
 Cantaloupe strike of 1928
 Católicos por La Raza
 Center for Mexican American Studies at Arlington
 Centro Cultural de la Raza
 Cesar Chavez Day
 Cesar Chavez (film)
 Chicana Rights Project
 Chicana/o studies
 Chicano
 Chicano English
 Chicana feminism
 Chicanafuturism
 Chicanismo
 Chicana art
 Chicano art movement
 Chicano Blowouts
 Chicano films
 Chicano literature
 Chicano Moratorium
 Chicano Movement
 Chicano nationalism
 Chicano poetry
 Chicano Park
 Chicano rock
 Chicano rap
 Cholo (subculture)
 Church in the Barrio
 Colegio César Chávez
 Comisión Femenil Mexicana Nacional
 Community Service Organization
 Conferencia de Mujeres por la Raza
 Coyolxauhqui imperative
 Cuisine of the Southwestern United States
 Culture Clash (performance troupe)

D
 Deferred Action for Childhood Arrivals
 Delano grape strike
 Department of Homeland Security v. Regents of the University of California
 Desert Blood
 Dirty Girls Social Club

E
 East L.A. walkouts
 East Los Streetscapers
 El Congreso de Pueblos de Habla Española
 El Malcriado
 El Teatro Campesino
 Emplumada
 Espinoza v. Farah Manufacturing Co.
 Estrada Courts
 Estrada Courts murals

F
 Flores-Figueroa v. United States
 Frito Bandito
 From This Wicked Patch of Dust

G
 Gadsden Purchase
 Galería de la Raza
 Gentefied
 George Lopez (TV series) 
 Grammy Award for Best Mexican/Mexican-American Album
 Greaser Act
 Greaser (derogatory)
 Great American Boycott
 Great Wall of Los Angeles
 Gregorio Cortez
 Gringo justice

H
 Hector P. Garcia
 Hernandez v. Texas
 Hijas de Cuauhtémoc
 Hispanos
 Hispanos of New Mexico
 History of Mexican Americans
 History of Mexican Americans in Dallas–Fort Worth
 History of Mexican Americans in Houston
 History of Mexican Americans in Los Angeles
 History of Mexican Americans in Metro Detroit
 History of Mexican Americans in Texas
 History of Mexican Americans in Tucson
 Huelga schools (Houston)
 House on Mango Street

I
 I Am Joaquin
 Immigration Reform and Control Act of 1986
 Indigenous Mexican Americans

J
 Josefa Segovia
 Jovita Idar
 Juan Crow
 Julian Castro 2020 presidential campaign
 Justice for Janitors

K
 Killing of Adam Toledo

L
 La Matanza (1910–1920)
 La Prensa
 La Raza
 Las Adelitas de Aztlán
 Las Gorras Blancas
 League of United Latin American Citizens
 League of United Latin American Citizens v. Perry
 Leal Garcia v. Texas
 Lemon Grove Incident
 List of Chicano poets
 List of Chicano rappers
 List of Mexican Americans
 List of Mexican-American communities
 List of Mexican-American political organizations
 List of Mexican-American writers
 List of New Mexico Territory Civil War units
 Little School of the 400
 Living Up the Street
 Los Four
 Los Seis de Boulder
 Los Siete de la Raza
 Lowrider
 Lowrider bicycle

M
 Madrigal v. Quilligan
 Mala Noche
 MANA, A National Latina Organization
 Manifest Destinies: The Making of the Mexican American Race
 March 2006 LAUSD student walkouts
 MEChA
 Medellín v. Texas
 Mendez v. Westminster
 Mexican Americans
 Mexican fiestas in the United States
 Mexicantown, Detroit
 Mexican American bibliography
 Mexican-American cuisine
 Mexican-American Education Council
 Mexican-American folklore
 Mexican American Legal Defense and Educational Fund
 Mexican American Legislative Caucus
 Mexican-American middle class
 Mexican American Odyssey
 Mexican American Political Association
 Mexican American professionals
 Mexican American Studies Department Programs, Tucson Unified School District
 Mexican–American War
 Mexican American Youth Organization
 Mexicans in Omaha, Nebraska
 Mexicans in Chicago
 Mexican muralism
 Mexican Repatriation
 Mexican Texas
 Mexican WhiteBoy
 Missionary Catechists of Divine Providence
 Moment of Silence (poem)
 Mujeres Muralistas
 Murder of Gabriel Fernandez
 Murder of Joe Campos Torres
 Murder of Santos Rodriguez
 Murder of Selena
 Murders of Raul and Brisenia Flores
 Mutualista

N
 Nahui Ollin
 National Association of Chicana and Chicano Studies
 National Mexican-American Anti-Defamation Committee
 National Museum of Mexican Art
 Nepantla
 New Mexican cuisine
 New Mexico music
 New tribalism

O
 Olvera Street
 Operation Wetback

P
 Pachucas
 Pachuco
 PADRES
 Paño
 PCUN
 Pensamiento Serpentino
 Perez v. Brownell
 Perez v. Sharp
 Pilsen Historic District
 Pinto (subculture)
 Plan de Santa Bárbara
 Plan Espiritual de Aztlán
 Plan of San Diego
 Plyler v. Doe
 Political Association of Spanish-Speaking Organizations
 Porvenir massacre (1918)
 Precita Eyes
 Proposition 187
 Punjabi Mexican Americans

Q
 Quinto Sol

R
 Rain God
 Rasquachismo
 Raza Unida Party
 Reconquista (Mexico)
 Revolt of the Cockroach People
 Royal Chicano Air Force

S
 Salt of the Earth
 San Antonio Independent School District v. Rodriguez
 San Elizario Salt War
 Second Ward, Houston
 Self Help Graphics & Art
 Sí se puede
 Shooting of Alex Nieto
 Shooting of Andy Lopez
 Skull art
 Sleepy Lagoon murder
 Society of Mexican American Engineers and Scientists
 So Far from God
 Sonoratown, Los Angeles
 Southern California drywall strike
 Spanglish
 Speedy Gonzales
 Spiritual activism
 SVREP

T
 Teatro Campesino
 Tejano music
 Tex-Mex
 The Moths
 This Bridge Called My Back
 Tortilla art
 Traditionalist Mexican-American Catholic Church
 Treaty of Guadalupe Hidalgo

U
 UCLA Chicano Studies Research Center
 Under the Feet of Jesus
 United Cannery, Agricultural, Packing, and Allied Workers of America
 United Farm Workers
 United States v. Brignoni-Ponce

V
 Vergüenza (social concept)
 Viva Kennedy Campaign

W
 Who Would Have Thought It?

X
 Xicanx

Y
 ...y no se lo tragó la tierra
 Youth control complex

Z
 Zoot suit
 Zoot Suit Riots

References 

Mexican-American-related topics